Stanley Bernard Greenberg (born May 10, 1945) is an American pollster and political strategist affiliated with the Democratic Party. Greenberg is a founding partner of Greenberg Quinlan Rosner Research (GQR) and Democracy Corps, political consulting and research firms headquartered in Washington, D.C.

Described as a "pollster supremo", Greenberg is known to have played a crucial role in the elections of Bill Clinton as President of the United States and Tony Blair as Prime Minister of the United Kingdom. As an anti-racist activist, Greenberg has written extensively about race relations in South Africa, and assisted Nelson Mandela's successful campaign in the 1994 South African general election.

Early life and career 
Greenberg grew up in a Jewish family in Washington, D.C. In an article for Pacific Standard titled "Why Are You So Smart, Stan Greenberg?", Greenberg explained that a high school course called "American Civilization" partially inspired him to seek a career in politics. A political scientist who received his bachelor's degree from Miami University and his Ph.D. from Harvard, Greenberg spent a decade teaching at Yale University before becoming a political consultant.

Greenberg's 1985 study of Reagan Democrats in Macomb County, Michigan, became a classic of progressive political strategy and the basis for his continuing argument that Democrats must actively work to present themselves as populists advocating the expansion of opportunity for the middle class.

Political consulting career 
As the pollster for Clinton in 1992, Greenberg was a major figure in the famed campaign "war room" (and hence the documentary film of the same name). He was the CEO and principal owner of Greenberg Quinlan Rosner until 2016.

After that, Greenberg was solely involved in Greenberg Research, where he is the CEO. He is co-founder (with James Carville and Bob Shrum) of Democracy Corps, a non-profit organization that produces left-leaning political strategy. He previously worked at Greenberg Carville Shrum, a political campaign consultancy firm. Greenberg is a noted advocate of progressive economic policies, and collaborated with left-wing think tank Economic Policy Institute (EPI) on a seminar titled "It's The Middle Class, Stupid!".

In May 2010 Greenberg was linked to a controversy involving White House Chief of Staff Rahm Emanuel. As a House member, Emanuel had lived rent-free for five years in a basement guest room in the DC house owned by Greenberg and his wife, Democratic House member Rosa DeLauro of Connecticut. During this time, Emanuel served as chairman of the Democratic Congressional Campaign Committee, which awarded large polling contracts to Greenberg's firm. Greenberg's former corporate clients include British Petroleum, British Airways, Monsanto Company, Boeing, General Motors, and Microsoft.

International political work 
Greenberg advised the presidential campaigns of Bill Clinton and Al Gore, as well as hundreds of other candidates and organizations in the United States, Latin America, Europe, and around the world – including Nelson Mandela, Ehud Barak the former Israeli prime minister, Gerhard Schröder, the former Chancellor of Germany, and Tony Blair, the former British prime minister. During his work for the Austrian SPÖ in 2001, Greenberg was criticized by FPÖ leader Jörg Haider over allegations of negative campaigning.

Personal life
Greenberg is married to Congresswoman Rosa DeLauro, who currently represents Connecticut's 3rd congressional district. Public financial disclosures filed in Congress indicate Greenberg's current company, Greenberg Research, is worth up to $5 million.

Books
 
Politics and Poverty: Modernization and Response in Five Poor Neighborhoods (1974)
Race and State in Capitalist Development: South Africa in Comparative Perspective (1980).
Legitimating the Illegitimate: State, Markets, and Resistance in South Africa (1987)
Middle Class Dreams: The Politics and Power of the New American Majority (1995)
The Two Americas: Our Current Political Deadlock and How to Break It (2004) 
Dispatches From The War Room: In The Trenches With Five Extraordinary Leaders (2009) 
America Ascendant: A Revolutionary Nation's Path to Addressing Its Deepest Problems and Leading the 21st Century (2015)
RIP GOP: How the New America Is Dooming the Republicans (2019)

References

External links
Stanley B. Greenberg, Ph.D.,  Greenberg Quinlan Rosner Research
Democracy Corps

Miller Center Oral History (2005)
Miller Center Oral History (2007)

1945 births
Businesspeople from Philadelphia
American male non-fiction writers
American political consultants
American political writers
BP people
Harvard Graduate School of Arts and Sciences alumni
Living people
Miami University alumni
Pollsters
Spouses of Connecticut politicians
Yale University faculty
Jewish American writers
Connecticut Democrats
Businesspeople from Connecticut
20th-century American male writers
Businesspeople from Washington, D.C.
21st-century American male writers
Writers from Philadelphia
Writers from Connecticut
American chief executives
21st-century American Jews